Mostafizur Rahman politician of Patuakhali District of Bangladesh, Physician and former member of Parliament for Patuakhali-4 constituency in February 1996.

Career 
Rahman is a former president of BNP's Kalapara upazila and former chairman of Kalapara upazila. He was elected a member of parliament from Patuakhali-4 as a Bangladesh Nationalist Party candidate in 15 February 1996 Bangladeshi general election. He was defeated by Patuakhali-4 constituency in the 7th Jatiya Sangsad elections on 12 June 1996 as a candidate of Bangladesh Nationalist Party and as an independent in the 8th Jatiya Sangsad elections of 2001.

References 

Bangladesh Nationalist Party politicians
6th Jatiya Sangsad members
Living people
Year of birth missing (living people)
People from Patuakhali district